Un'alma innamorata (HWV 173) is a dramatic secular cantata for soprano and instruments written by Georg Frideric Handel in 1707. Other catalogues of Handel's music have referred to the work as HG liiB,92; and HHA v/5,97. The title of the cantata translates as "A soul in love".

History
The work was written for Ruspoli for performance at his country estate in Vignanello (near Rome). The copyist's bill is dated 30 June 1707. It is possible that the soprano part was composed for the singer Vittoria Tarquini (with whom Handel is rumoured to have had a relationship), and it is known that Vittoria was among the guests at the estate in Vignanello around the time of composition. Although uncertain, the text of the cantata may have been written by Abbé Francesco Mazziotti (who was the tutor of Ruspoli's eldest son).

Synopsis
Even though the work is performed by a female voice, the text does not reveal whether the "voice" of the text is male or female. The text relates that a heart which is faithful in love becomes angry when it is wounded by love, however the singer is happy because it loves more than one heart and spurns the harsh laws and rigours of love (as defined by Cupid).

Structure
The work is scored for violin and keyboard (with occasional figured bass markings in the second movement). The cantata contains three recitative-aria pairings.

A typical performance of the work takes about fifteen and a half minutes.

Movements
The work consists of six movements:

(Movements do not contain repeat markings unless indicated. The number of bars is the raw number in the manuscript—not including repeat markings. The above is taken from volume 52B, starting at page 92, of the Händel-Gesellschaft edition.)

See also
List of cantatas by George Frideric Handel

References

 

Cantatas by George Frideric Handel
1707 compositions